Tanjung Lumpur Highway, or Jalan Abu Bakar, Federal Route 183, is a major highway in Kuantan, Pahang, Malaysia. The Kilometre Zero of the Federal Route 183 starts at Padang Lalang junctions.

Features

At most sections, the Federal Route 183 was built under the JKR R5 road standard, allowing maximum speed limit of up to 90 km/h.

List of junctions

References

Malaysian Federal Roads
Highways in Malaysia